PQ 15 can refer to :

Convoy PQ 15, an Arctic convoy of the Second World War
Culver XPQ-15, an American light aircraft of the 1940s